David Sutherland (4 June 1873 – 6 October 1971) was an Australian cricketer. He played six first-class cricket matches for Victoria between 1897 and 1901.

See also
 List of Victoria first-class cricketers

References

External links
 

1873 births
1971 deaths
Australian cricketers
Victoria cricketers
Cricketers from Melbourne